Loot is an American comedy television series created by Matt Hubbard and Alan Yang that premiered on June 24, 2022, on Apple TV+. The series stars Maya Rudolph, Michaela Jaé Rodriguez, Joel Kim Booster, Ron Funches and Nat Faxon, and received generally positive reviews. In July 2022, the series was renewed for a second season.

Cast and characters

Main

 Maya Rudolph as Molly Novak
 Michaela Jaé Rodriguez as Sofia Salinas
 Joel Kim Booster as Nicholas
 Ron Funches as Howard
 Nat Faxon as Arthur

Recurring

 Adam Scott as John Novak
 Meagen Fay as Rhonda
 Stephanie Styles as Ainsley	
 Olivier Martinez as Jean-Pierre

Guest
 Seal as himself
 David Chang as himself
 Dylan Gelula as Hailey
 Caitlin Reilly as Jacinda
 Sean Evans as himself
 Brendan Scannell as Paul
 George Wyner as Martin Streibler
 Kym Whitley as Renee
 GaTa as himself

Episodes

Production
It was announced in March 2021 that Apple TV+ had ordered to series an untitled comedy that would star Maya Rudolph, created by Matt Hubbard and Alan Yang. In May, Michaela Jaé Rodriguez was cast, with Joel Kim Booster joining in July. Olivier Martinez was cast for a recurring role in November. Nat Faxon and Ron Funches would be revealed as part of the main cast upon the series first look. On July 11, 2022, Apple TV+ renewed the series for a second season.

Filming on the series began on September 6, 2021.

Release
The series debuted on Apple TV+ on June 24, 2022.

Reception
The review aggregator website Rotten Tomatoes reported an 81% approval rating with an average rating of 6.9/10, based on 42 critic reviews. The website's critics' consensus reads, "Loot doesn't quite service comedic treasure Maya Rudolph as satisfyingly as a star vehicle should, although there are enough riches here to suggest a big return on investment—when this promising sitcom finds its footing." Metacritic, which uses a weighted average, assigned a score of 65 out of 100 based on 22 critics, indicating "generally favorable reviews".

References

External links
  on Apple TV+
 

2020s American workplace comedy television series
2022 American television series debuts
Apple TV+ original programming
English-language television shows
Mass media portrayals of the upper class
Television series about divorce
Television series by 3 Arts Entertainment
Television series by Universal Television
Television shows set in Los Angeles